Agricola (G. Tsolakidis & Co. O.E.) was a Greek maker of 4x4 multi-purpose trucks and other farm machinery based in Thessaloniki. The Agricola 25 GT 4x4 truck was a fairly advanced design introduced in 1975, with enhanced all-terrain capabilities, a metal cab and Mercedes-Benz 180D Diesel engine. The cab was designed by Georgios Michael, designer of other Greek vehicles including the Neorion Chicago and the MAVA-Renault Farma. The vehicle was produced until 1984.

Sources 
L.S. Skartsis and G.A. Avramidis, 'Made in Greece', Typorama, Patras, Greece (2003).
G.N. Georgano (Ed.), 'The Complete Encyclopedia of Commercial Vehicles', Krause Publication, Iola, Wisconsin (1979).

External links 
Agricola in Dutch Auto Catalog

Defunct truck manufacturers
Off-road vehicles
Defunct motor vehicle manufacturers of Greece
Manufacturing companies based in Thessaloniki
1984 disestablishments in Greece